Raymond Bynoe (born 9 May 1993) is a Barbadian cricketer. He made his List A debut for Combined Campuses and Colleges in the 2016–17 Regional Super50 on 3 February 2017.

References

External links
 

1993 births
Living people
Barbadian cricketers
Combined Campuses and Colleges cricketers
Place of birth missing (living people)